Abington School District v. Schempp, 374 U.S. 203 (1963), was a United States Supreme Court case in which the Court decided 8–1 in favor of the respondent, Edward Schempp on behalf of his son Ellery Schempp, and declared that school-sponsored Bible reading and the recitation of the Lord's Prayer in public schools in the United States was unconstitutional.

Background

Origin of case
The Abington case began when Edward Schempp, a Unitarian Universalist and a resident of Abington Township, Pennsylvania, filed suit against the Abington School District in the United States District Court for the Eastern District of Pennsylvania to prohibit the enforcement of a Pennsylvania state law that required his children, specifically Ellery Schempp, to hear and sometimes read portions of the Bible as part of their public school education. That law (24 Pa. Stat. 15-1516, as amended, Pub. Law 1928) required that "[a]t least ten verses from the Holy Bible [be] read, without comment, at the opening of each public school on each school day." Schempp specifically contended that the statute violated his and his family's rights under the First and Fourteenth Amendments.

Pennsylvania law, like that of four other states, included a statute compelling school districts to perform Bible readings in the mornings before classes. Twenty-five states had laws allowing "optional" Bible reading, with the remainder of the states having no laws supporting or rejecting Bible reading. In eleven of those states with laws supportive of Bible reading or state-sponsored prayer, the state courts had declared the laws to be unconstitutional.

A related case was that brought by Madalyn Murray O'Hair, mother of plaintiff William J. Murray III (b. 1946), who filed suit against the local school system in Murray v. Curlett to prohibit compulsory prayer and Bible reading in public schools. In 1963, she founded the group American Atheists (originally known as the Society of Separationists). The Murray case was consolidated with Schempp's case on appeal to the Supreme Court.

District court arguments 
During the first trial in federal district court, Edward Schempp and his children testified as to specific religious doctrines purveyed by a literal reading of the Bible "which were contrary to the religious beliefs which they held and to their familial teaching" (177 F. Supp. 398, 400). The children testified that all of the doctrines to which they referred were read to them at various times as part of the exercises. Edward Schempp testified at the second trial that he had considered having his children excused from attendance at the exercises but decided against it for several reasons, including his belief that the children's relationships with their teachers and classmates would be adversely affected.

District court ruling 
The district court ruled in Schempp's favor, and struck down the Pennsylvania statute. The school district appealed the ruling. While that appeal was pending, the Pennsylvania legislature amended the statute to allow children to be excused from the exercises upon the written request of their parents. This change did not satisfy Schempp, however, and he continued his action against the school district, charging that the amendment of the law did not change its nature as an unconstitutional establishment of religion. Because of the change in the law, the Supreme Court had responded to the school district's appeal by vacating the first ruling and remanding the case to the district court.  The district court again found for Schempp. The school district appealed to the Supreme Court again, and, on appeal, the case was consolidated with a similar Maryland case launched by O'Hair.

When striking down the statute during the second trial, the district court made specific findings of fact that the children's attendance at Abington Senior High School was compulsory. The court also found that the law compelled reading 10 verses from the Bible, going on to say that:

The reading of the verses, even without comment, possesses a devotional and religious character and constitutes in effect a religious observance. The devotional and religious nature of the morning exercises is made all the more apparent by the fact that the Bible reading is followed immediately by a recital in unison by the pupils of the Lord's Prayer. The fact that some pupils, or theoretically all pupils, might be excused from attendance at the exercises does not mitigate the obligatory nature of the ceremony for ... Section 1516 ... unequivocally requires the exercises to be held every school day in every school in the Commonwealth. The exercises are held in the school buildings and perforce are conducted by and under the authority of the local school authorities and during school sessions. Since the statute requires the reading of the 'Holy Bible,' a Christian document, the practice ... prefers the Christian religion. The record demonstrates that it was the intention of ... the Commonwealth ... to introduce a religious ceremony into the public schools of the Commonwealth. (201 F. Supp., at 819; quoted in )

Precedents for case 
The Court explicitly upheld Engel v. Vitale, in which the Court ruled that the sanctioning of a prayer by the school amounted to a violation of the Establishment Clause of the First Amendment to the United States Constitution, which states, "Congress shall make no law respecting an establishment of religion." The Abington court held that in organizing a reading of the Bible, the school was conducting "a religious exercise," and "that cannot be done without violating the 'neutrality' required of the State by the balance of power between individual, church and state that has been struck by the First Amendment".

Over the previous two decades, the Supreme Court, by incorporating specific rights into the Due Process Clause of the Fourteenth Amendment, had steadily increased the extent to which rights contained in United States Bill of Rights were applied against the states.

Opinions of the Court 
The Supreme Court granted certiorari in order to settle the persistent and vigorous protests resulting from its previous decision in Engel v. Vitale regarding religion in schools. Henry W. Sawyer argued the case for Schempp.

Decision 
The Supreme Court upheld the District Court's decision and found the Pennsylvania prayer statute unconstitutional by virtue of the facts in the case, as well as the clear line of precedent established by the Supreme Court. In writing the opinion of the Court, Justice Tom C. Clark stated, "This Court has decisively settled that the First Amendment's mandate [in the Establishment Clause] has been made wholly applicable to the States by the Fourteenth Amendment ... in a series of cases since Cantwell.

What was unexpected, however, were the ideas expressed in the second portion of Justice Clark's opinion written for the majority. The Court's recognition of religious ideals as valuable to the culture of the United States in that opinion are generally not cited much by either side of the church-state debate when discussing the case and the effect it had on the United States. His opening thoughts explicitly spelled out that view in past jurisprudence with cases similar to Abington v. Schempp.

Clark continued that the Court was of the feeling that no matter the religious nature of the citizenry, the government at all levels, as required by the Constitution, must remain neutral in matters of religion "while protecting all, prefer[ring] none, and disparag[ing] none." The Court had clearly rejected "the contention by many that the Establishment Clause forbade only governmental preference of one faith over another."

Citing Justice Hugo Black in Torcaso v. Watkins, Justice Clark added, "We repeat and again reaffirm that neither a State nor the Federal Government can constitutionally force a person 'to profess a belief or disbelief in any religion.' Neither can it constitutionally pass laws or impose requirements which aid all religions as against non-believers, and neither can it aid those religions based on a belief in the existence of God as against those religions founded on different beliefs." Such prohibited behavior was self-evident in the Pennsylvania law requiring Bible reading (and allowing recitation of the Lord's Prayer) in its public schools. The Court recognized the value of such ideal neutrality from lessons of history when government and religion were either fully fused or cooperative with one another and religious liberty was nonexistent or seriously curtailed.

Brennan's concurrence 
Justice Brennan filed a lengthy and historically significant concurrence, taking seventy-three pages to elaborate his ideas about what the Framers intended in the formation of the First and Fourteenth Amendments, gauging the value of religion in American culture, reviewing legal precedents, and suggesting a course for future church-state cases. Brennan focused on the history of the Establishment Clause to counter numerous critics of the Court's Engel decision, who pointed out that prayer in public schools, as well as in many other areas of public life, was a longstanding practice going back to the framing of the Constitution and Bill of Rights. He professed to be aware of the "ambiguities in the historical record", and felt a modern-day interpretation of the First Amendment was warranted. In defense of that approach, Brennan stated:

In answer to critics of a broad interpretation of the prohibitions against government in the realm of religion, Brennan said, "nothing in the text of the Establishment Clause supports the view that the prevention of the setting up of an official church was meant to be the full extent of the prohibitions against official involvements in religion".

In the third section of his exhaustive concurrence, Justice Brennan charted the course that led to the incorporation of the First Amendment's religion clauses by way of answering the charge of Abington Township's counsel that Pennsylvania's Bible reading statute was a state issue, outside the purview of the federal court system, including that of the Supreme Court. He labeled the daily recitals of the Lord's Prayer and reading of the Bible as "quite [clear] breaches of the command of the Establishment Clause". He noted the long history of such practices, even before the "founding of our Republic". Additionally, he stated that most of those who demanded reading of the Bible and prayer in schools were hoping to serve "broader goals than compelling formal worship of God or fostering church attendance". He cited the 1858 words of the Wisconsin Superintendent of Public Instruction, who saw the Bible as aptly suited to "teaching the noblest principles of virtue, morality, patriotism, and good order".

Justice Brennan took great pains to also show that many states, such as South Dakota, New Hampshire, Wisconsin, Ohio and Massachusetts, had already enacted and revoked laws similar to Pennsylvania's by the first half of the 20th century. In addition, many political leaders including attorneys general and presidents like Ulysses S. Grant and Theodore Roosevelt insisted that "matters of religion be left to family altars, churches and private schools" and "[It] is not our business to have the Protestant Bible or the Catholic Vulgate or the Talmud read in [public] schools" .

Brennan's concurrence also recognized the plurality of religious thought in the nation as basis enough for restriction of church and state relations. He cited this lack of appreciation of that pluralism as the "basic flaw" of Pennsylvania's Bible reading statute and Abington Township's defense of it:

There are persons in every community—often deeply devout—to whom any version of the Judaeo-Christian Bible is offensive. There are others whose reverence for the Holy Scriptures demands private study or reflection and to whom public reading or recitation is sacrilegious.... To such persons it is not the fact of using the Bible in the public schools, nor the content of any particular version, that is offensive, but the manner in which it is used.

Stewart's dissent 
Justice Potter Stewart filed the only dissent in the case. In it, he was critical of both the lower court opinions and the decision the Supreme Court had reached regarding them. He wished to remand the case to lower courts for further proceedings.

Stewart had dissented in Engel v. Vitale and viewed the doctrine relied on in that case as implausible, given the long history of government religious practice in the United States, including the fact that the Supreme Court opens its own sessions with the declaration, "God Save this Honorable Court" and that Congress opens its sessions with prayers, among many other examples. Stewart believed that such practice fit with the nation's long history of permitting free exercise of religious practices, even in the public sphere.

He declared the cases consolidated with Schempp as "so fundamentally deficient as to make impossible an informed or responsible determination of the constitutional issues presented"—specifically, of whether the Establishment Clause was violated. As to the intent and scope of the religion clauses of the First Amendment:

It is, I think, a fallacious oversimplification to regard the [religion clauses] as establishing a single constitutional standard of "separation of church and state", which can be applied in every case to delineate the required boundaries between government and religion.... As a matter of history, the First Amendment was adopted solely as a limitation upon the newly created National Government. The events leading to its adoption strongly suggest that the Establishment Clause was primarily an attempt to insure that Congress not only would be powerless to establish a national church, but would also be unable to interfere with existing state establishments. ... So matters stood until the adoption of the Fourteenth Amendment, or more accurately, until this Court's decision in Cantwell....

He stated his agreement with the doctrine of the Fourteenth Amendment's embrace and application of the Bill of Rights, but pointed out the irony of such an amendment "designed to leave the States free to go their own way should now have become a restriction upon their autonomy".

Other critics of the Court's findings in Abington v. Schempp often quote the following excerpt from Justice Stewart's opinion:

If religious exercises are held to be an impermissible activity in schools, religion is placed in an artificial and state-created disadvantage.... And a refusal to permit religious exercises thus is seen, not as the realization of state neutrality, but rather as the establishment of a religion of secularism, or at least, as governmental support of the beliefs of those who think that religious exercises should be conducted only in private.

Subsequent developments 
The public was divided in reaction to the Court's decision; the decision has sparked persistent and ongoing criticism from proponents of prayer in school. In 1964, Life magazine declared Madalyn Murray O'Hair, the mother of the plaintiff in one of the associated cases, to be "the most hated woman in America."

Newspapers were no exception. The Washington Evening Star, for example, criticized the decision, declaring that "God and religion have all but been driven from the public schools. What remains? Will the baccalaureate service and Christmas carols be the next to go? Don't bet against it." In contrast, The New York Times was more accepting of the Court's ruling. The paper printed significant portions of the opinions with no significant comments, either supportive or critical. Opponents characterized the decision as the one which "kicked God and prayer out of the schools".

The views of various religious entities on the decision split between mainline Protestants and Jews, who in general strongly supported the decision, and evangelical Protestants and conservative Catholics, who strongly opposed the decision. Speaking from the evangelical perspective, Billy Graham said, "[i]n my opinion ... the Supreme Court ... is wrong. ... Eighty percent of the American people want Bible reading and prayer in the schools. Why should a majority be so severely penalized ...?" The mainline denominations, with the exception of the Roman Catholic Church, expressed less critical opinions of the verdict. Some considered it to support religious freedom because it limited governmental authority in the sphere of public schools.

The United States Congress reacted by drafting more than 150 resolutions to overturn the ruling by a constitutional amendment. Abington v. Schempp was used as precedent for similar cases such as Board of Education v. Allen and Lemon v. Kurtzman in the decades that followed. The three-part Lemon test had its basis in the jurisprudence of Abington v. Schempp. Under the test, the constitutionality of a given church-state law is weighed by three criteria: whether a law has a non-secular purpose, advances or inhibits religion, or results in excessive government entanglement with religion.

The Lemon test was overturned in the 2022 decision of Kennedy v. Bremerton School District. There, the Court ruled that a coach that held a private prayer on the sports field, joined voluntarily by students and others, did not violate the Establishment Clause and maintained the First Amendment rights of the coach. However, this decision did not affect Schempp and restrictions against school prayer.

See also 
 Edgerton Bible Case
 List of United States Supreme Court cases, volume 374
 School prayer

Notes

References

Citations

Sources
 
 Billy Graham voices shock over decision. (June 18, 1963). New York Times. p. 17.
 
 
 
 
 * Laats, Adam. "Our schools, our country: American evangelicals, public schools, and the Supreme Court decisions of 1962 and 1963." Journal of religious history 36.3 (2012): 319-334.

External links 
 
 
 An article in the encyclopedia of civil liberties in the United States Abington Township School District v. Schempp author Timothy L. Hall
 Casey Scott McKay, "Tactics, Strategies, & Battles – Oh My!: Perseverance of the Perpetual Problem Pertaining to Preaching to Public School Pupils & Why it Persists," University of Massachusetts Law Review: Vol. 8: Iss. 2, Article 3 (2013). 

1963 in United States case law
Religion and education
United States Supreme Court cases of the Warren Court
Establishment Clause case law
United States education case law
Education in Montgomery County, Pennsylvania
Legal history of Pennsylvania
1963 in religion
1963 in education
American Civil Liberties Union litigation
United States Supreme Court cases